Margaret Domka (born August 13, 1979) is an American school teacher and soccer referee from Oak Creek, Wisconsin.

Career
She was selected as a match official for the 2015 FIFA Women's World Cup.  She was previously a FIFA international assistant referee in 2007 and 2008, and worked the 2010 and 2014 FIFA U-20 Women's World Cups.  She also worked the 2012 Algarve Cup championship. Domka was formerly an NCAA Division III All-American at University of Wisconsin–Stevens Point.

References

1979 births
Living people
American soccer referees
FIFA Women's World Cup referees
Women association football referees
American sportswomen
People from Oak Creek, Wisconsin
21st-century American women
American women referees and umpires